Moncaup is the name of the following communes in France:
Moncaup, Haute-Garonne, in the Haute-Garonne department
Moncaup, Pyrénées-Atlantiques, in the Pyrénées-Atlantiques department